New Zealand Professional Boxing Association (NZPBA) is one of the four governing bodies for the sport of professional boxing in New Zealand. NZPBA is a non-profit organisation.

History
The Body was founded as South Pacific Boxing Association, with the name changed to New Zealand Professional Boxing Association inc in 1984 at their AGM. The new name was greeted and accepted by the World Bodies and Commonwealth Boxing Council.

In 2006, NZPBA had their first female national champion with Daniella Smith defeating Sue Glassey for the Super Welterweight title. Smith is New Zealand's second professional National Champion.

In April 2016, NZPBA sanctioned New Zealand's first major world title fight (from one of the four major sanctioning bodies) for the WBC female middleweight title with Kali Reis defeating Maricela Cornejo by split decision. The fight night also featured two of New Zealand's first WBC Silver title fights with Melissa St. Vil defeating Baby Nansen and Ronica Jeffrey defeating Gentiane Lupi. On the same night, NZPBA had New Zealand's first female professional boxing referee, with Shelley Ashton officiating Nailini Helu vs. Kirsty Lupeamanu.

Controversy
Former NZPBA President Lance Revill, is well known to stating his opinion to New Zealand's local media, causing major scrutiny to the association. Most recently, his comments were more directed at Joseph Parker. Since the beginning of Parker's career, Revill has made regular comments about Parker including when he turned pro, Parker's promoters only being interested in money, Parker being too hyped up and his belief that Parker didn't win his world title fight in December 2016. In February 2017, it was announced that due to the backlash of his comments against Parker, Revill resigned as president of NZPBA. Vise President John Conway was named interim President.

In 2018, NZPBA officiated a corporate boxing event in Christchurch in November where first time corporate boxer Kain Parsons, was knocked unconscious. Kain Parsons was taken to Christchurch Hospital's intensive care unit, however, Parsons died four days later after the event. Vise President of the organisation at time Kevin Pyne was the referee of the fight. Former NZPBA President Lance Revill stated that he believed the fight should have been stopped earlier. In 2019, Kevin Pyne was elected president of NZPBA, despite being the referee of the fight.

Current roles

Board members
President: Kevin Pyne

Vise President: 1st John Conway, 2nd David Kettle

National Secretary: Fiona Moore

National Treasurer: Pat Leonard

Webmaster: Raylyne Siaosi and Kendall Cooper

Doctors: David Renata & Shaaren Jacobs

Regional Representatives
Northland & Auckland: Jo Gallagher and Mal Siaosi

Bay of Plenty & Waikato: Bob Mitchell

Manawatu & East/West Coast: Shelley Ashton

Wellington Supervisor: Ian Scott

South Island Supervisor: Paul Fitzimmons

Current national champions

Men

Female

Current provincial champions

NZPBA Central title

Heavyweight Men

Middleweight Men

Boxing and Wrestling Act 1981

See also
List of New Zealand female boxing champions
List of New Zealand heavyweight boxing champions
List of New Zealand cruiserweight boxing champions
List of New Zealand light heavyweight boxing champions
List of New Zealand super middleweight boxing champions
List of New Zealand middleweight boxing champions
List of New Zealand super welterweight boxing champions
List of New Zealand welterweight boxing champions
List of New Zealand super lightweight boxing champions
List of New Zealand lightweight boxing champions
List of New Zealand super featherweight boxing champions
List of New Zealand featherweight boxing champions
List of New Zealand bantamweight boxing champions
Australian National Boxing Federation
Commonwealth Boxing Council

References

External links
 

Sports governing bodies in New Zealand
Boxing in New Zealand
Professional boxing organizations